Jacco Eltingh and Paul Haarhuis defeated the defending champions Guy Forget and Cédric Pioline in the final, 6–4, 6–3 to win the senior gentlemen's invitation doubles tennis title at the 2015 Wimbledon Championships.

Draw

Final

Group A
Standings are determined by: 1. number of wins; 2. number of matches; 3. in two-players-ties, head-to-head records; 4. in three-players-ties, percentage of sets won, or of games won; 5. steering-committee decision.

Group B
Standings are determined by: 1. number of wins; 2. number of matches; 3. in two-players-ties, head-to-head records; 4. in three-players-ties, percentage of sets won, or of games won; 5. steering-committee decision.

References
Draw

Seniors's Invitation Doubles